David Henry Stocks (born 20 April 1943) is an English former professional footballer who played as a defender for Charlton Athletic, Gillingham, AFC Bournemouth and Torquay United. In total he made 461 appearances in the Football League between 1961 and 1977, scoring five goals.

References

1943 births
Living people
English footballers
Footballers from Dulwich
Association football defenders
Gillingham F.C. players
Charlton Athletic F.C. players
Torquay United F.C. players
AFC Bournemouth players